Troy Township may refer to one of the following places in the State of Indiana:

Troy Township, Perry County, Indiana
Troy Township, Fountain County, Indiana
Troy Township, DeKalb County, Indiana
 and also: Etna-Troy Township, Whitley County, Indiana

See also

Troy Township (disambiguation)

Indiana township disambiguation pages